The 2012 San Diego State Aztecs football team represented San Diego State University in the 2012 NCAA Division I FBS football season. The Aztecs were led by second-year head coach Rocky Long and played their home games at Qualcomm Stadium. This was San Diego State's 14th season in the Mountain West Conference.

Schedule

Game summaries

@ Washington

Army

North Dakota

San Jose State

@ Fresno State

Hawaii

Colorado State

@ Nevada

UNLV

@ Boise State

Air Force

@ Wyoming

BYU–Poinsettia Bowl

References

San Diego State
San Diego State Aztecs football seasons
Mountain West Conference football champion seasons
San Diego State Aztecs football